Homatula laxiclathra is a species of stone loach endemic to China.

This species reaches a length of

References

Nemacheilidae
Fish of Asia
Freshwater fish of China
Taxa named by Gu Jin-Hui
Fish described in 2010